Dolo Airport  is an airport serving Dolo in Ethiopia.

Airport was constructed between 2009 and 2012, and supports UNHCR refugee operations in the area.

See also
Transport in Ethiopia

References

 Google Earth
 OpenMaps Maps

Airports in Ethiopia